Hendrik Völzke (born 22 March 1975) is a German former professional footballer who played as a midfielder. He made his single Bundesliga appearance for Werder Bremen on 1 March 1997 in a 2–2 draw against VfB Stuttgart.

References

External links
 

Living people
1975 births
Association football midfielders
German footballers
Bundesliga players
Regionalliga players
SV Werder Bremen players
SV Werder Bremen II players
VfB Oldenburg players
VfB Lübeck players
Altonaer FC von 1893 players